The Shopping mall Fünf Höfe (English: Five Courtyards) in the center of Munich (in the area of Salvator-, Theatiner-, Kardinal-Faulhaber-Straße) was created from 1998 to 2003 after the coring of a HypoVereinsbank building complex. In 2004, the Fünf Höfe was sold to DIFA (today Union Investment Real Estate AG) and since then the official name has been CityQuartier Fünf Höfe.

General Information 
In total, the Fünf Höfe offers their visitors, on the approximately 14,000 square meter area, around 60 stores and about 2,500 square meters of cafés and restaurants. They also include the Hypo-Kunsthalle (approximately 3,200 m² of floor space), which displays temporary exhibitions on changing themes, artists and epochs.

In addition, there are 24,300 m² of office space as well as some 3,200 m² of apartments, which from the passages are hardly noticeable.

The shops and pubs are predominantly related to the upscale price classes.

Building history 
The plan for the redesign of the whole block was the first international competition success of Basel architects Jacques Herzog and Pierre de Meuron in 1994. The client was the Fünf Höfe GmbH & Co KG represented through HVB Immobilien AG (a subsidiary of the then HypoVereinsbank)

In the long-term preservation of the façades and parts of the old building, Herzog & de Meuron radically altered the old town block, which had been closed down until then, and made it into an ensemble of courtyards and passages with different views and insights, in which each courtyard should have its own character. In the first phase, completed on 8 February 2001, the Perusa- and Portiahof as well as the Pranner- and a part of the Salvatorpassage and the Hypo-Kunsthalle were created. The architect Ivano Gianola planned the Maffeihof and designed the area to the south of the Fünf Höfe into the Schäfflerhof. In the second phase, which was inaugurated on 19 March 2003, the Munich architecture firm Hilmer & Sattler und Albrecht designed the façade to Salvatorstrasse.

Art 
Some of the courtyards and passages are decorated with works of art:

 In the Salvatorpassage the "Hanging Gardens" by Tita Giese was installed.
 In the Prannerpassage, glass sequined mosaics made of round-cut, clear window glass are inserted into the gray exposed concrete in the walls and ceilings on 317 m² of the Mayer'sche Hofkunstanstalt, creating a glitter effects.
   The "Sphere", a large hanging ball made of steel mesh designed by Olafur Eliasson, is displayed in the Viscardihof.

References

External links 

 Overview Fünf Höfe
 Photos, Süddeutsche Zeitung, 2008

Website
 Official website

2000s architecture
Herzog & de Meuron buildings
Shopping malls in Germany
Buildings and structures in Munich